Maximum temperature may refer to:

Highest temperature recorded on Earth
Maximum safe storage temperature, the highest temperature at which a chemical may safely be stored
Maximum operating temperature, the highest temperature at which a piece of equipment may safely be operated

See also
Maximum surface temperature of an asteroid, a physical characteric of an asteroid
Temperature range (disambiguation)